Farlowella knerii is a species of armored catfish endemic to Ecuador where it occurs in the Napo and Pastaza River basins.  This species grows to a length of  SL.

References
 

knerii
Fish of South America
Freshwater fish of Ecuador
Fish described in 1882